Vieillot's black weaver (Ploceus nigerrimus) is a species of bird in the family Ploceidae. It is found 
in southeast Nigeria to Uganda, west Kenya, Angola and the Democratic Republic of the Congo. The common name is after the French ornithologist Louis Jean Pierre Vieillot. 

This species was formely considered to be conspecific with chestnut-and-black weaver (Ploceus castaneofuscus). The species were split based on the striking differences in the colour of the plumage.

References

External links
 Vieillot's black weaver -  Species text in Weaver Watch.

Vieillot's black weaver
Birds of Central Africa
Vieillot's black weaver
Taxa named by Louis Jean Pierre Vieillot
Taxonomy articles created by Polbot